John Winans (September 27, 1831January 17, 1907) was an American lawyer and politician in Janesville, Wisconsin.  He served one term in the United States House of Representatives from Wisconsin's 1st congressional district, and served six years in the Wisconsin State Assembly representing Janesville and central Rock County.  He also held several local offices, including two terms as Mayor of Janesville.

Background 
Winans was born in Vernon, New Jersey, and was educated in public and private schools. He studied law and was admitted to the bar in 1855. He came to Wisconsin in 1857 and settled in Janesville, where he practiced his profession. He served as member of the city council of Janesville in 1861, and as city attorney several times. He served as delegate to the 1864 Democratic National Convention, and in 1868 was the Democratic nominee for Congress from Wisconsin's 2nd congressional district, against incumbent Republican Benjamin F. Hopkins.

Legislature 

Winans was first elected to the State Assembly from Rock County's 5th Assembly district (the City of Janesville) in 1873 as a member of the short-lived Reform Party, a coalition of Democrats, reform and Liberal Republicans, and Grangers formed in 1873, which secured the election for two years of William Robert Taylor as Governor of Wisconsin. He received 741 votes to 633 for Republican incumbent Henry A. Patterson, and was assigned to the standing committee on the judiciary, of which he was elected chairman. He ran for re-election in 1874 under the "Democratic Reform" label (the Reform coalition had begun to dissolve, and Taylor would lose his 1875 bid for re-election), but was unseated by Republican Hiram Merrill, who drew 799 votes to 694 for Winans. Winans served as a colonel on the staff of Governor Taylor in 1874 and 1875.

He returned to the practice of law, and was elected to the Assembly again as a Democrat in 1881 from the new 2nd Rock County district (the City of Janesville, plus the Towns of Janesville and Rock) with 806 votes to 618 for Republican Oscar F. Nowlan and 109 for Prohibitionist G. W. Lawrence (Republican incumbent Franklin Lawrence was not a candidate for re-election; it is unknown whether the two Lawrences were related). He returned to the judiciary committee, and was also assigned to the committee on bills on the third reading. Winans was also selected by the Wisconsin Supreme Court in 1882 as one of the Commissioners to represent them in planning the expansion of the Wisconsin State Capitol Building.

Congress 
Winans was elected as an independent Democrat to the Forty-eighth Congress (March 4, 1883 – March 3, 1885) representing Wisconsin's 1st congressional district, unseating five-term Republican incumbent Charles G. Williams, with 12,307 votes to 11,853 for Williams, 2207 for Prohibitionist C. M. Blackman, and 10 for former State Senator William L. Utley, who had served in the legislature as a Free Soiler and a Republican, but was now a Greenback.

He was not a candidate for renomination in 1884, since he was running for mayor of Janesville. He was succeeded in Congress by Republican Lucien Caswell.

After Congress 
He was elected  mayor of Janesville in April 1885 for a two-year term, over Republican Charles Valentine. He was elected to the Assembly as a Democrat again in 1886, after being defeated in a run for the United States Senate by incumbent Republican Philetus Sawyer, who won the votes of 82 legislators, to 37 for Winans and six for Populist John Cochrane. For the Assembly, he received 1,132 votes to 1,047 for Republican Oscar Nowland (Republican incumbent Pliny Norcross was not a candidate) and 91 for Prohibitionist James Harris. When the Assembly session opened, he was the Democratic candidate for Speaker, losing to Republican Thomas B. Mills in what turned out to be a six-man race. He once more returned to the judiciary committee, and to the committee on bills on the third reading. He was not a candidate for re-election in 1888, and was succeeded by Republican Cyrus Miner.

He was elected to the Assembly (as a Democrat) for the final time in 1890; the 2nd district no longer included the Town of Rock, but did include those of Center and Harmony. He received 1487 votes to 1308 for Nowland and 67 for Prohibitionist C. W. Cook. He again became chair of the judiciary committee; and was also on the joint committees on charitable and penal institutions, and on apportionment (serving as Assembly co-chair of the latter committee). After the redistricting of 1891, most of his district was put in the new 3rd Rock County Assembly district; Winans did not run for re-election, and was succeeded by fellow Democrat Agesilaus Wilson.

Out of office again 
He ran for Assembly again in 1896, but was defeated by William G. Wheeler, who had apprenticed in his law offices as a young man.

He continue to engage in the practice of law in Janesville, until his death on January 17, 1907. He was interred in Oak Hill Cemetery.

Electoral history

Wisconsin Assembly (1873, 1881)

| colspan="6" style="text-align:center;background-color: #e9e9e9;"| General Election, November 4, 1873

| colspan="6" style="text-align:center;background-color: #e9e9e9;"| General Election, November 8, 1881

U.S. House (1882) 

| colspan="6" style="text-align:center;background-color: #e9e9e9;"| General Election, November 7, 1882

Wisconsin Assembly (1886, 1890, 1896)

| colspan="6" style="text-align:center;background-color: #e9e9e9;"| General Election, November 2, 1886

| colspan="6" style="text-align:center;background-color: #e9e9e9;"| General Election, November 4, 1890

| colspan="6" style="text-align:center;background-color: #e9e9e9;"| General Election, November 3, 1896

Sources

References 

1831 births
1907 deaths
Mayors of places in Wisconsin
Democratic Party members of the Wisconsin State Assembly
People from Vernon Township, New Jersey
Politicians from Janesville, Wisconsin
Wisconsin city council members
New Jersey lawyers
Wisconsin lawyers
Wisconsin Reformers (19th century)
Democratic Party members of the United States House of Representatives from Wisconsin
19th-century American politicians